Junshan Lakealso known as "Sun Moon Lake" during ancient times, is a freshwater lake in China. It is located in Jinxian County of Jiangxi Province, situated to the south of Poyang Lake. The drainage basin has an area of 615 km2, with an elevation of 18 m, a length of 25 km and a greatest breadth from east to west of
18.2 km (the average breadth is only 7.7 km). The lake has a surface area of 192.5 km2, and volume is about 7.66×108m3. The maximum depth of the Junshan Lake is 6.4 m, though the average is 4 m. The lake is rich in fish and crab.

Notes

Lakes of China
Bodies of water of Jiangxi